Jennifer D. Benally was a state representative from Arizona, representing the 7th district. A member of the Democratic Party, Benally was first elected to the Arizona House of Representatives in 2015. Benally did not seek reelection in 2016.

Early life and education
Benally is Zuni Edgewater Clan born for Tangle Root Clan. Benally was born in Albuquerque, New Mexico but moved to Arizona in 1957. She earned her degree from Northern Arizona University and served as a Navajo Nation police officer from 1982 to 1990.  Benally become a Tuba City Prosecutor in 1992. After six years as a prosecutor, Benally became a district court judge for the Navajo Nation.

Elections
 2014 Benally and Albert Hale defeated Joshua Lavar Butler in the Democratic primary. Hale and Benally were unopposed in the general election.

Personal life
Benally and her husband, Kent, together have 10 children and 14 grandchildren.

See also
 List of Native American jurists

References

External links
 Ballotpedia page
 House Page
 Vote Smart

Living people
21st-century American politicians
21st-century American women politicians
21st-century Native Americans
Democratic Party members of the Arizona House of Representatives
Native American state legislators in Arizona
Native American women in politics
Navajo judges
Northern Arizona University alumni
People from Coconino County, Arizona
Women state legislators in Arizona
Year of birth missing (living people)
21st-century Native American women